Pyrenecosa rupicola is a wolf spider species found in France, Spain and Switzerland.

References

External links 

Lycosidae
Spiders of Europe
Spiders described in 1821